Greens Run is a  long 2nd order tributary to Buffalo Creek in Brooke County, West Virginia.

Course
Greens Run rises about 0.5 miles north-northwest of Pettit Heights, West Virginia, and then flows northeast to join Buffalo Creek about 0.25 miles south of Marshall Terrace.

Watershed
Greens Run drains  of area, receives about 39.9 in/year of precipitation, has a wetness index of 280.76, and is about 85% forested.

See also
List of rivers of West Virginia

References

Rivers of West Virginia
Rivers of Brooke County, West Virginia